The Diocese of Cahul and Comrat is a diocese of the Metropolis of Chișinău and All Moldova under the Moscow Patriarchate with its seat in the city of Cahul, Moldova.

History
The Diocese of Cahul and Comrat was established on July 17, 1998, by the Holy Synod of the Russian Orthodox Church to shepherd the Orthodox Church in southern Moldova.

As of 2010 the Eparchy consisted of 138 parishes and 5 monasteries served by 155 full-time priests and 8 deacons. Its current bishop is Anatolie (Botnari).

References

External links
Eparchy of Cahul and Comrat (Romanian)
Eparchy of Cahul and Comrat (Russian)

Eparchies of the Russian Orthodox Church
Eastern Orthodox dioceses in Moldova